Santa Kumar Limbu is a Bhutanese footballer who currently plays for Bhutan Premier League club Ugyen Academy FC and the Bhutan national team.

Club career
For the 2022 season Limbu played for Ugyen Academy FC of the Bhutan Premier League. Following the season, he received the Young Emerging Player Award from the Bhutan Football Federation. As part of the award he received a cash prize of Nu 30,000.

In January 2023 Ugyen Academy kicked off the new season with a 6–1 victory over Chukha Central School in the Bhutan Higher Secondary School Football Championship. Limbu scored three of his team's goals en route to earning Man-of-the-Match honours.

International career
Limbu was called up to a Bhutan national team for the first time for the 2023 AFC U-20 Asian Cup qualification. He went on to score two goals in the tournament, the first against Bangladesh and the second against Bahrain.

In 2023 at age nineteen Limbu was called up to the senior national team for the first time for upcoming friendlies and the 2023 SAFF Championship.

Youth international goals
Scores and results list Bhutan's goal tally first.

References

External links
Soccerway profile
Global Sports Archive profile

Living people
2003 births
Bhutanese footballers
Association football forwards